Married to the Game is the fifteenth studio album by American rapper Too Short. It was released on November 4, 2003 through Jive Records, making it his 12th album on the label.

Track listing

Charts

References

Too Short albums
2003 albums
Albums produced by Ant Banks
Albums produced by Jazze Pha
Albums produced by Lil Jon
Jive Records albums